Entemnotrochus is a genus of large to very large deepwater sea snails with gills and an operculum, marine gastropod mollusks in the family Pleurotomariidae, the slit snails.

Extant Species
According to the World Register of Marine Species (WoRMS), the following species with valid names are included within the genus Entemnotrochus :
 Entemnotrochus adansonianus (Crosse & Fischer, 1861)
 Entemnotrochus rumphii (Schepman, 1879)
Species brought into synonymy 
 Entemnotrochus urashima Shikama & Oishi in Shikama, 1977 : synonym of  Entemnotrochus rumphii (Schepman, 1879)

Fossil species
 Entemnotrochus ozakii Kase & Katayama, 1981
 Entemnotrochus panchangwui Lin, 1975
 Entemnotrochus Shikamai Kanie, 1973
 Entemnotrochus siuyingae Lin, 1975

References

 NOAA info including photos of live animals and videos
 Williams, S.T., Karube, S. & Ozawa, T. (2008) Molecular systematics of Vetigastropoda: Trochidae, Turbinidae and Trochoidea redefined. Zoologica Scripta 37, 483–506

External links
 Fischer P. (1880-1887). Manuel de Conchyliologie et de Paléontologie Conchyliologique. Paris, Savy pp. XXIV + 1369 + pl. 23

Pleurotomariidae

zh:龙宫翁戎螺